Babereh-ye Olya (also Romanized as Bābareh-ye ‘Olyā; also known as Bābereh, Bābereh-ye Bālā, and Bābertīn-e ‘Olyā) is a village in Harzandat-e Sharqi Rural District, in the Central District of Marand County, East Azerbaijan Province, Iran. At the 2006 census, its population was 263, in 65 families.

References 

Populated places in Marand County